Åfjord Church is a parish church of the Church of Norway in Åfjord municipality in Trøndelag county, Norway. It is located in the village of Årnes, just east of the Åfjorden and west of the lake Stordalsvatnet. It is one of two churches in the Åfjord og Stoksund parish which is part of the Fosen prosti (deanery) in the Diocese of Nidaros. The white, wooden church was built in a long church style in 1879 using plans drawn up by the architect Knut Guttormsen. The church seats 430 people. It was consecrated on 9 October 1879 by Bishop Andreas Grimelund.

History
The earliest existing historical records of the church date back to the year 1329, but the church was not new that year. The church was originally dedicated to John the Baptist. The church was historically known as Aa Church. The old church was repaired in 1675, 1684, and again in 1715. On 28 January 1770, the church burned down. Over the next couple years, a new church was built on the same site. It was consecrated on 8 July 1772. It was a wooden long church. Originally, it had a small tower on the roof.

In 1814, this church served as an election church. Together with more than 300 other parish churches across Norway, it was a polling station for elections to the 1814 Norwegian Constituent Assembly which wrote the Constitution of Norway. This was Norway's first national elections. Each church parish was a constituency that elected people called "electors" who later met together in each county to elect the representatives for the assembly that was to meet in Eidsvoll later that year.

In 1849, the church was struck by lightning which caused some fire damage to the roof. During the reconstruction after this fire, the old tower was taken down and a large new tower was constructed on the west end of the building. By the late 1800s, the church was getting to be in poor condition. It was also getting too small for the congregation. The new building was consecrated on 9 October 1879. The old church was torn down in 1880.

Media gallery

See also
List of churches in Nidaros

References

Åfjord
Churches in Trøndelag
Long churches in Norway
Wooden churches in Norway
19th-century Church of Norway church buildings
Churches completed in 1879
13th-century establishments in Norway
Norwegian election church